Martine Buron (born 12 January 1944) is a French architect and politician. She is the daughter of Robert Buron.

Since 1973, she initially worked as an architect in Paris and then in Nantes.

In 1981 she became the vice secretary of the Socialist Party, responsible for the women's sector. She became the socialist mayor of Châteaubriant in 1989 and was re-elected in 1995. She fostered inter-municipal cooperation between the small ones. From 2001 to 2008 he joined the opposition.

She was elected Member of European Parliament (MEP) for the Socialist Party in 1989 until 1994.

References

Bibliography 
 Christian Le Bart, «Sur deux récits d'entrée en politique», on Pôle Sud, n° 7, 1997

1944 births
MEPs for France 1984–1989
MEPs for France 1989–1994
Mayors of places in Pays de la Loire
French women architects
Living people
20th-century French women politicians
Socialist Party (France) politicians